John Swannell is the name of:

 John Swannell (footballer)
 John Swannell (photographer)